
Gmina Błędów is a rural gmina (administrative district) in Grójec County, Masovian Voivodeship, in east-central Poland.

Villages
Gmina Błędów contains the villages and settlements of Annopol, Bielany, Błędów, Błędów Nowy, Błogosław, Bolesławiec Leśny, Borzęcin, Bronisławów, Cesinów-Las, Czesławin, Dąbrówka Nowa, Dąbrówka Stara, Dańków, Fabianów, Głudna, Golianki, Goliany, Gołosze, Huta Błędowska, Ignaców, Jadwigów, Jakubów, Janki, Julianów, Kacperówka, Katarzynów, Kazimierki, Łaszczyn, Lipie, Machnatka, Machnatka-Parcela, Oleśnik, Pelinów, Potencjonów, Roztworów, Sadurki, Śmiechówek, Tomczyce, Trzylatków Duży, Trzylatków Mały, Trzylatków-Parcela, Wilcze Średnie, Wilhelmów, Wilkonice, Wilków Drugi, Wilków Pierwszy, Wólka Dańkowska, Wólka Gołoska, Wólka Kurdybanowska, Zalesie, Załuski, Ziemięcin and Zofiówka.

Neighbouring gminas
Gmina Błędów is bordered by the gminas of Belsk Duży, Biała Rawska, Mogielnica, Mszczonów, Pniewy and Sadkowice.

References
Polish official population figures 2006

Bledow
Grójec County